Rich Communication Services (RCS) is a communication protocol between mobile telephone carriers and between phone and carrier, aiming at replacing SMS messages with a text-message system that is richer, provides phonebook polling (for service discovery), and can transmit in-call multimedia. It is part of the broader IP Multimedia Subsystem. Google added support for end-to-end encryption for all chats in their own RCS-based app, Messages.

It is also marketed as Advanced Messaging, chat features, joyn, SMSoIP,  Message+, and SMS+.

In early 2020, it was estimated that RCS was available from 88 operators in 59 countries with approximately 390 million users per month.

History 
The Rich Communication Suite industry initiative 
was formed by a group of industry promoters in 2007. In February 2008 the GSM Association officially became the project home of RCS and an RCS steering committee was established by the organisation.

The steering committee specified the definition, testing, and integration of the services in the application suite known as RCS. Three years later, the RCS project released a new specification – RCS-e (e = 'enhanced'), which included various iterations of the original RCS specifications. The GSMA program is now called Rich Communication Services.

The GSMA published the Universal Profile in November 2016. The Universal Profile is a single GSMA specification for advanced communications. Carriers that deploy the Universal Profile guarantee interconnection with other carriers. 47 mobile network operators, 11 manufacturers, and 2 OS providers (Google and Microsoft) have announced their support. Google's Jibe Cloud platform is an implementation of the RCS Universal Profile, designed to help carriers launch RCS quickly and scale easily.

Samsung is the major device original equipment manufacturer (OEM) to support RCS. Samsung RCS capable devices have been commercially launched in Europe since 2012 and in the United States since 2015.

Google supports RCS on Android devices with its Android SMS app Messages. In April 2018, it was reported that Google would be transferring the team that was working on its Google Allo messaging service to work on a wider RCS implementation. In June 2019, Google announced that it would begin to deploy RCS on an opt-in basis via the Messages app, with service compliant with the Universal Profile and hosted by Google rather than the user's carrier. The rollout of this functionality began in France and the United Kingdom. Google initially branded RCS functionality under the generic term "chat features"; in February 2023 Google began to replace references to "chat" with "RCS". 

In response to concerns over the lack of end-to-end encryption in RCS, Google stated that it would only retain message data in transit until it is delivered to the recipient. In November 2020, Google later announced that it would begin to roll out end-to-end encryption for one-on-one conversations between Messages users, beginning with the beta version of the app. In December 2020, Samsung updated its Samsung Experience messages app to also allow users to opt into RCS. Google added end-to-end encryption to their Messages app using the Signal Protocol as the default option for one-on-one RCS conversations starting in June 2021. In December 2022, end-to-end encryption was added to group chats in the Google Messages app for beta users and will be made available to all users in early 2023.

In October 2019, the four major U.S. carriers announced an agreement to form the "Cross-Carrier Messaging Initiative" to jointly implement RCS using a newly developed app. This service will be compatible with the Universal Profile. Both T-Mobile and AT&T later signed deals with Google to adopt Google's Messages app.

In September 2022, Apple Inc. CEO Tim Cook said the company has no plans to support RCS on its devices or any interoperability with iMessage.

RCS specifications 

RCS combines different services defined by 3GPP and Open Mobile Alliance (OMA) with an enhanced phonebook. Another phone's capabilities and presence information can be discovered and displayed by a mobile phone.
RCS reuses 3GPP specified IMS core system as the underlying service platform taking care of issues such as authentication, authorization, registration, charging and routing.

 Release 1 Version 1.0 (15.12.2008) Offered the first definitions for the enrichment of voice and chat with content sharing, driven from an RCS enhanced address book (EAB).
 Release 2 Version 1.0 (31.08.2009) Added broadband access to RCS features: enhancing the messaging and enabling sharing of files.
 Release 3 Version 1.0 (25.02.2010) Focused on the broadband device as a primary device.
 Release 4 Version 1.0 (14.02.2011) Included support for LTE.
 Release 5 Version 1.0 (19.04.2012) RCS 5.0 is completely backwards-compatible with RCS-e V1.2 specifications and also includes features from RCS 4 and new features such as IP video call, IP voice call and Geo-location exchange. RCS5.0 supports both OMA CPM and OMA SIMPLE IM. RCS 5.0 includes the following features.
 Standalone Messaging
 1-2-1 Chat
 Group Chat
 File Transfer
 Content Sharing
 Social Presence Information
 IP Voice call (IR92 and IR.58)
 IP Video call (IR.94)
 Geolocation Exchange
 Capability Exchange based on Presence or SIP OPTIONS
 Release 5.1 5.1 is completely backwards compatible with the RCS-e V1.2 and RCS 5.0 specifications. It introduces additional new features such as Group Chat Store & Forward, File Transfer in Group Chat, File Transfer Store & Forward, and Best Effort Voice Call, as well as lessons-learnt and bug fixes from the V1.2 interoperability testing efforts. RCS 5.1 supports both OMA CPM and OMA SIMPLE IM. 
 Version 1.0 (13.08.2012)
 Version 2.0 (03.05.2013)
 Version 3.0 (25.09.2013)
 Version 4.0 (28.11.2013)
 Release 5.2 Version 5.0 (07.05.2014) Improved central message store and introduced service extension tags into the specification. It also introduced a number of incremental improvements and bug fixes to RCS 5.1 V4.0 that improve the user experience and resolve issues that were noticed in deployed RCS networks
 Release 5.3 Version 6.0 (28.02.2015)
 Release 6.0 Version 7.0 (21.03.2016) Support for Visual Voice Mail and more
 Release 7.0 Version 8.0 (28.06.2017) Support for Chatbots, SMS fallback features and more
 Release 8.0 Version 9.0 (16.05.2018) Support for additional Chatbots features and vCard 4.0

RCS-e (enhanced) 

 Initial Version (May 2011)
 Version 1.2 (28.11.2011)
 Version 1.2.2 (04.07.2012)

Joyn 

The GSMA defined a series of specific implementations of the RCS specifications. The RCS specifications often define a number of options for implementing individual communications features, resulting in challenges in delivering interoperable services between carriers. The RCS specifications aim to define a more specific implementation that promotes standardization and simplify interconnection between carriers.

At this time there are two major relevant releases:
 Joyn Hot Fixes - based upon the RCS 1.2.2 specification (previously known as RCS-e), this includes 1:1 chat, group chat, MSRP file sharing and video sharing (during a circuit-switched call). Services based upon this specification are live in Spain, France and Germany.
 Joyn Blackbird Drop 1 - based upon the RCS 5.1 specification, this extends the Joyn Hot Fixes service to include HTTP file sharing, location sharing, group file sharing, and other capabilities such as group chat store and forward. Joyn Blackbird Drop 1 is backwards compatible with Joyn Hot Fixes. Vodafone Spain's network is accredited for Joyn Blackbird Drop 1, and Telefónica and Orange Spain have also been involved in interoperability testing with vendors of Joyn Blackbird Drop 1 clients. A number of client vendors are accredited to Joyn Blackbird Drop 1.

Two or more future releases are planned:
 Joyn Blackbird Drop 2 - also based upon the RCS 5.1 specification, this will primarily add IP voice and video calling. The test cases for Joyn Blackbird Drop 2 have yet to be released by the GSMA.
 Joyn Crane - Already available in GSMA web page.

RCS Universal Profile 

The GSMA's Universal Profile is a single set of features for product development and operator deployment of RCS.

 Version 1.0 (November 2016) Includes core features such as capability discovery which will be interoperable between regions, chat, group chat, file transfer, audio messaging, video share, multi-device, enriched calling, location share and live sketching.
 Version 2.0 (July 2017) Includes Messaging as a Platform, APIs, plug-in integration and improved authentication and app security.
 Version 2.1 (December 2017)
 Version 2.2 (May 2018)
 Version 2.3 (December 2018)
 Version 2.4 (October 2019) Removes plug-in integration and includes integrated seamless web-view.

RCS Business Messaging 
RCS Business Messaging (RBM) is the B2C (A2P in telecoms terminology) version of RCS. This is supposed to be an answer to third-party messaging apps (or OTTs) absorbing mobile operators' messaging traffic and associated revenues. While RCS is designed to win back Person-to-Person (P2P) traffic, RBM is intended to retain and grow this A2P traffic. RCS offers "rich" features similar to those of messaging apps, but delivered (in theory) via the preloaded SMS messaging app - for example Google Messages or Samsung Messages. By making these features available in a B2C setting, RBM is expected to attract marketing and customer service spend from enterprises, thanks to improved customer engagement and interactive features that facilitate new use cases. This was the primary reason for the development of RCS by the GSMA.

RBM includes features not available to ordinary users, including predefined quick-reply suggestions, rich cards, carousels, and branding. This last feature is intended to increase consumer confidence and reduce fraud through the implementation of a verified sender system. These additional features are only available with the use of a messaging-as-a-platform (MaaP) server integrated with the operator's network. The MaaP controls the verified sender details, unlocking RBM features, while also segregating P2P and A2P RCS messages, aiding monetisation of the latter (SMS currently suffers from grey routes, where A2P messages are sent over P2P connections, which are cheaper or often free).

Status 

According to GSMA PR in 2012, Rich Communication Services (RCS) carriers from around the globe supporting the RCS standard included AT&T, Bell Mobility, Bharti Airtel, Deutsche Telekom, Jio, KPN, KT Corporation, LG U+, Orange, Orascom Telecom, Rogers Communications, SFR, SK Telecom, Telecom Italia, Telefónica, Telia Company, Telus, Verizon and Vodafone.

Universal Profile is currently backed by "a large and growing ecosystem" (68 supporters in 2019). Universal Profile support is optional in 4G, but mandatory in 5G networks and devices.

 55 operators: Advanced Info Service, América Móvil, AT&T Mobility, Axiata, Beeline, Base, Bell Mobility, Bharti Airtel, China Telecom, China Unicom, Claro Americas, Deutsche Telekom, Etisalat, Globe Telecom, Ice, Indosat Ooredoo, Jio, KDDI, KPN, M1 Limited, MegaFon, Millicom, MTN Group, MTS (network provider), NTT Docomo, Optus, Orange S.A., Personal, Proximus, Rogers Communications, Singtel, Smart Communications, SLTMobitel, Sprint Corporation, T-Mobile US, Telcel, Tele2, Telefónica, Telenor, Telia Company, Telkomsel, Telstra, Telus, TIM (brand), Turkcell, Verizon Communications, VEON, and Vodafone.
 12 OEMs: TCL (Alcatel Mobile), Asus, General Mobile, HTC, Huawei, Intex Technologies, Lava International, LG Electronics, Lenovo (Motorola), Samsung Electronics, Sony and ZTE.
 2 mobile OS providers: Google and Microsoft.

Interconnect and hubs 
Like SMS, RCS requires national and international interconnects to enable roaming. As with SMS, this will be accomplished with hubbing - where third-party providers complete agreements with individual operators to interwork their systems. Each subsequent operator that connects to a hub is therefore connected automatically to all other connected operators. This eliminates the need to each operator to connect to all the others to which they may need to send messages. RCS hubs are provided by stakeholders with a vested interest in increasing RCS use. These include traditional SMS hub providers (e.g. Global Message Services and Sinch), software and hardware vendors (e.g. Interop Technologies, Mavenir, and ZTE), and also Google via its Jibe Cloud platform.

Accreditation 

The RCS interop and testing (IOT) accreditation process was started by the GSMA in order to improve the quality of testing, increase transparency, drive scale, minimize complexity and accelerate time-to-market (TTM) of joyn services. Companies need to undertake the IOT process from the GSMA to apply for a license to use the service mark joyn.

"Accredited" means that the device, client or network has undertaken a series of test cases (150 to 300) in a specific set of conditions, provided test results and traces that have been analysed by the GSMA RCS IOT team and any IOT issues arising resolved with the submitter.

"Accreditation Ready" is the designation awarded to a hosted RCS service that has undertaken the same series of test cases as the mobile network operator, provided test results and traces that have been analysed by the GSMA RCS IOT team and any IoT issues arising resolved with the submitter.

A list of RCS AS providers and their GSMA RCS Accreditation status can be found here:

Reception 
Amnesty International researcher Joe Westby criticized RCS for not allowing end-to-end encryption, because it is treated as a service of carriers and thus subject to lawful interception.

The Verge criticized the inconsistent support of RCS in the United States, with carriers not supporting RCS in all markets, not certifying service on all phones, or not yet supporting the Universal Profile. Concerns were shown over Google's decision to run its own RCS service due to the possibility of antitrust scrutiny, but it was acknowledged that Google had to do so in order to bypass the carriers' inconsistent support of RCS, as it wanted to have a service more comparable to Apple's iMessage service available on Android.

Ars Technica also criticized Google's move to launch a direct-to-consumer RCS service, considering it a contradiction of RCS being native to the carrier to provide features reminiscent of messaging apps, counting it as being among various past and unsuccessful attempts by Google to develop an in-house messaging service (including Google Talk, Google+ Messenger, Hangouts, and Allo), and noting limitations: such as its dependencies on phone numbers as the identity (whereas email-based accounts are telco-agnostic), not being capable of being readily synchronized between multiple devices, and the aforementioned lack of end-to-end encryption.

See also 
 Matrix communication protocol

References

External links
  
Specifications

Mobile technology
Mobile telecommunication services
Text messaging